Lawrence Sifuna Sifuna (born January 23, 1946) is a Kenyan politician who was Member of Parliament for Bumula, the first MP of that constituency. He was first elected to the Kenyan Parliament on November 8, 1979 in the then larger Bungoma South constituency. Sifuna was re-elected in 1983 too. He lost to a former North Eastern Provincial Commissioner Maurice Makhanu in the 1988 General Election after Bungoma South constituency was renamed Kanduyi. Sifuna recaptured the seat during the first multi-party General Election of 1992 on a Ford Asili ticket.

Hon. Sifuna went to Sang'alo  School and Nalondo Intermediate School before he moved to Mariri College in Uganda, where he sat for the Cambridge General Certificate of Education (CGCE) examination. The former MP is a fully trained chartered accountant. He is a Fellow of Chartered Accountants (FCA) and a Fellow of the Association of International Accountants (FAIA). Sifuna is a household name in Bungoma county popular for defending the welfare of sugarcane growers.

On the national stage, Hon. Sifuna is remembered as one of the left-wing members of parliament in the 1980s (a.k.a. the seven bearded sisters) who persistently attacked AG Njonjo and government policies that clamped down on the basic human rights of Kenyans. Others included Koigi wa Wamwere, James Orengo, Abuya Abuya, Chibule wa Tsuma, Onyango Midika, Mwashengu wa Mwachofi and Philomena Chelangat Mutai. They are part of the larger group that fought for Kenya's second liberation., Omumutilu, Kenya's Second Liberation Fighter and a member of the bearded sisters

References

1946 births
Living people
Kenyan politicians